Yandina is a rural town and locality in the Sunshine Coast Region, Queensland, Australia. In the  the locality of Yandina had a population of 2,371 people.

Geography 
Yandina is in the Sunshine Coast hinterland. The Bruce Highway runs through the locality from south to north, passing just east of the town. Its name comes from the local Aboriginal words 'yan', meaning "to go", and 'dinna', meaning "on foot".

History

Aboriginal people have lived in the Yandina district for over 40,000 years. They belonged to the Gubbi Gubbi language group, which consisted of a number of tribes occupying traditional resource areas. Around Yandina, the Undandi tribal area was east of the present day railway line while the Nalbo area was west of the line. Legends, bora rings, pathways, grinding grooves, scarred trees and middens provide evidence of occupancy.

European settlement began in the 1850s and the town of Yandina was surveyed in 1870. It was the first town in the Maroochy district. Many of the original buildings and the heritage streetscape of Stevens Street have been preserved. The Anglican church, built initially as a community church and opened in 1880, is the oldest on the Sunshine Coast. It is part of the Anglican Diocese of Brisbane. The Yandina hotel dates back to 1889 and was relocated using rollers and a bullock team in 1891 when the railway came through town.  In the same year, the post office was moved to the new railway station. Privately owned Koongalba homestead is on the National Heritage List and is one of several historic homes in town. Yandina was originally planned to be the centre of the shire but as the local sugar mill was built in Nambour, more and more people who worked there moved closer.

Yandina Baptist Church opened in 1921. The Baptist congregation had previously been using the Anglican church for their services. In January 1921 the Baptists purchased the former union church in Pomona to relocate it to Railway Street in Yandina. The opening ceremony was held on Wednesday 16 March 1921.

The early timber getters logged beech, cedar, bunya pine and flooded gum. The timber industry remained important until the 1970s when a shortage of timber forced the closure on the Yandina mill. The fertile land around Yandina has been used for beef and dairy cattle, fruit growing, sugar cane and ginger.

Yandina Presbyterian Church was officially opened on Saturday 30 November 1940.

Nambour & District Reds (or Nambour Reds) soccer club was established in 1974. In 1997 Nambour Reds merged with Yandina Eagles to create Nambour Yandina United.

The town was bypassed by the Bruce Highway in July 1997.

In the  the locality of Yandina had a population of 2,371 people.

Yandina Baptist Church celebrated its centenary in 2021.

Today, Yandina officially endures as the oldest continuously inhabited town on the Sunshine Coast.

Heritage listings
Yandina has a heritage-listed site:
 12 Wharf Street: Koongalba

Education 
Yandina State School is a government primary (Prep-6) school for boys and girls at 48 School Road. In 2018, the school had an enrolment of 289 students with 26 teachers (21 full-time equivalent) and 15 non-teaching staff (10 full-time equivalent). It includes a special education program.

There is no secondary school in Yandina. The nearest government secondary school in Nambour State College in Nambour to the south.

Facilities 
Maroochy River Fire Station is at 11 Branyandah Street.

Yandina Ambulance Station is at 2 Machinery Road.

There is a sewage treatment plant at 10 Focus Lane.

Yandina Cemetery is at 33 Cordwell Road.

Amenities 
The Sunshine Coast Regional Council operates a mobile library service which visits Stevens Street.

The Yandina branch of the Queensland Country Women's Association meets at the Yandina Hall at 11 Stevens Street.

Yandina RSL Hall is at 24 North Street.

Wonga Park is a sportsground at 8 North Street. It is the home ground of Nambour Yandina United, an association football club affiliated with Sunshine Coast Football.

Yandina has a number of churches including:

 All Saints' Anglican Church at 3 Farrell Street
Yandina Baptist Church at 31 Low Street (corner of Railway Street)
Yandina Seventh-Day Adventist Church at 23 North Street

Attractions 
Yandina is the home to the Buderim Ginger Factory and Nutworks.

Yandina Historic House is a local history museum and visitor information centre at 3 Pioneer Road. It is leased from the Sunshine Coast Council and operated by the Yandina & District Historical Society.

Transport 
Yandina Station on the Nambour and Gympie North Line has passenger train services to Brisbane.

In popular culture 
Peter Carey describes the Yandina of 1972 in his novel His Illegal Self.

See also

 Coolum
 Eumundi
 Buderim

References

Further reading

External links 

 

 , Sunshine Coast Libraries

Towns in Queensland
Suburbs of the Sunshine Coast Region
Populated places established in 1870
1870 establishments in Australia
Localities in Queensland